Wilson Bluff can mean:-

 Wilson Bluff (Antarctica) in Australian territory in Antarctica
 Wilson Bluff, Western and South Australian border on the Great Australian Bight coastline